Vicki Phillips (born about 1958) is an educator who has held government and non-profit positions in various parts of the United States.

Phillips was Secretary of the Pennsylvania Department of Education from 2003 to 2004, and previously served as Superintendent of the School District of Lancaster in Lancaster, Pennsylvania. She left Pennsylvania to become the Superintendent of Portland Public Schools in Portland, Oregon, where she served until 2007, when she was hired by the Bill & Melinda Gates Foundation.

References

External links 
 Profile on the Gates Foundation web site

Living people
Secretaries of Education of Pennsylvania
1950s births
21st-century American women educators
20th-century American women educators
School superintendents in Pennsylvania
Politicians from Portland, Oregon
Bill & Melinda Gates Foundation people
Portland Public Schools (Oregon)
21st-century American educators
School superintendents in Oregon
20th-century American educators